B.TECH is a retail chain of household appliances and consumer electronics in Egypt.

History 
Prior to its renaming in 2003, B.TECH was known as Olympic Stores. Currently, they operate over 88 branches spread across 25 governorates in Egypt and works with more than 600 dealers and distributors.

Brands 
B.TECH is an authorized seller of Braun, Ariston, Miele, Apple, and other international brands in Egypt.

Partnerships 
In 2016, Development Partners International (DPI), a UK private equity group acquired 33.3% of B.Tech for $35 million. The strategic partnership enabled the enhancement of supply chain and IT infrastructure and a number of new products were introduced.

The online payment operations of B.Tech is facilitated by Fawry Banking & Payment Technology Services Ltd. Apart from bank mobile wallets and credit cards, FawryPay provides customers easy direct debit or automatic debit of installment amounts form their debit and credit cards.

Expansion 

B.TECH also opened 17 new branches in 2019 with the intention of covering all governorates in Egypt.  They run 75 authorized service centers across Egypt with trained technicians and engineers. B. Tech Academy was set up to offer certified programs for employee skill development.

B.TECH has launched it's technological school in 2020, to improve the technological field in Egypt

References 

Retail companies of Egypt
Egyptian companies established in 1977
Retail companies established in 1977